Enrique Campos Menéndez (1914–2007) was Marquee of Torreblanca and a Chilean writer. He was born in Punta Arenas, on 12 August 1914 and died on 12 June 2007. He won the Chilean National Prize for Literature in 1986.

Education
Menéndez was the son of Francisco Campos Torreblanca and Maria Menendez Behety. He pursued studies at the Colegio Salesiano, San José, in his hometown, in Europe and finally at the Faculty of Economics at the University of Buenos Aires.

Career
Menéndez was elected representation of the Cautín Province (1949–1953 and 1953–1957) for the Liberal Party. He was chairman of the Foreign Affairs Committee of the Chamber of Representatives. He was a close associate of the military dictatorship of Augusto Pinochet, who was also a personal friend.

In 1976, he was appointed a member of the Chilean Academy of Language. He directed the film Largo Viaje (Long Haul) in conjunction with a Spanish producer. He was appointed Director of Libraries, Archives and Museums (1977–1986), during which time the Palace of the Royal Court was renovated so that it could be occupied by the current National Historical Museum. Additionally, with support from UNDP, he did an analysis of the museums in Chile. The National Coordination of Museums, the National Center for Conservation and Restoration, and the National Coordination of Public Libraries were established. The network of public libraries was also expanded and the National Library became the head of the National Network of Bibliographic Information.

Death
In 1986 he was awarded the National Literature Prize of Chile, the same year he was appointed ambassador of Chile in Spain. He died in 2007, aged 92, of cardiac arrest.

Works
The literary of genre of Menéndez' works were of a narrative style. The following are some of his major works.
 Kupén: cuentos de la Tierra del Fuego (1940)
 Bernardo O'Higgins: el padre de la patria chilena (1942)
 Fantasmas (1943)
 Lincoln (1945)
 Todo y nada (1947)
 Lautaro Cortés (1949)
 Se llamaba Bolívar (1954)
 Sólo el viento (1964)
 Los pioneros (1983)
 Águilas y cóndores (1986).
 Una vida por la vida (1996)
 Andrea (1999)

References

External links
 Reseña Biográfica Parlamentaria (Parliamentary Profile) – Enrique Campos Menéndez (in Spanish)
 Enrique Campos Menéndez at Memoria Chilena (in Spanish)

1914 births
2007 deaths
Chilean male writers
National Prize for Literature (Chile) winners